Humphrey "Teddy" Brannon (September 27, 1916, Moultrie, Georgia – February 24, 1989, Newark, New Jersey) was an American jazz and blues pianist.

Brannon began on piano at age nine. He played in dance bands in high school and worked locally in nightclubs in Newark from 1937-42. From November 1942 to early 1944 he toured and recorded with Benny Carter. He recorded with Roy Eldridge in 1944. 

From the mid-1940s to 1950, Brannon led his own groups in New York, while performing as a sideman at sessions led by Rubberlegs Williams (1945), Don Byas (1946), and Dinah Washington (1947–8).

In the 1950s and 1960s Brannon worked in the studios with doo wop groups and played extensively in jazz idioms, including with Don Byas, again with Roy Eldridge (recording in 1951), Buddy Rich, Bennie Green (recording in 1951), Johnny Hodges, Illinois Jacquet and recorded with Tab Smith. He also accompanied singers such as Ruth Brown, Billie Holiday, Babs Gonzales (Brannon's cousin).

Discography
With Jonah Jones
 Swingin' Round the World (Capitol, 1959)
 Jumpin' with a Shuffle (Capitol, 1961)
 The Unsinkable Jonah Jones Swings the Unsinkable Molly Brown (Capitol, 1961)
 Great Instrumental Hits Styled by Jonah Jones (Capitol, 1961)

With Roy Eldridge
 Rockin' Chair (Clef, 1951)

References
Footnotes

General references
 Eugene Chadbourne, [ Teddy Brannon] at Allmusic

1916 births
1989 deaths
American jazz pianists
American male pianists
Musicians from Georgia (U.S. state)
20th-century American pianists
20th-century American male musicians
American male jazz musicians